Walter Soza (born 13 October 1972) is a Nicaraguan swimmer. He competed in three events at the 1996 Summer Olympics.

References

1972 births
Living people
Nicaraguan male swimmers
Olympic swimmers of Nicaragua
Swimmers at the 1996 Summer Olympics
Place of birth missing (living people)